Clavulina cinerea is a species of coral fungus in the family Clavulinaceae. The common name for this species is gray coral. This grayish white edible fungus stands 2–10 cm tall, and can be found on the ground from July–October in Northeastern North America.

References

External links

 .
 

Edible fungi
Fungi described in 1788
Fungi of North America
cinerea
Taxa named by Jean Baptiste François Pierre Bulliard